The National Film Award for Best Actor, officially known as the Rajat Kamal Award for the Best Actor, is an honour presented annually at the National Film Awards of India instituted since 1967 to actors who have delivered the best performance in a leading role within the Indian film industry. Called the "State Awards for Films" when established in 1954, the National Film Awards ceremony is older than the Directorate of Film Festivals. The State Awards instituted the individual award in 1968 as the "Bharat Award for the Best Actor"; in 1975, it was renamed as the "Rajat Kamal Award for the Best Actor". Throughout the past 45 years, accounting for ties and repeat winners, the Government of India has presented a total of 52 "Best Actor" awards to 40 actors. Until 1974, winners of the National Film Award received a figurine and certificate; since 1975, they have been awarded with a "Rajat Kamal" (silver lotus), certificate and a cash prize.

Although the Indian film industry produces films in around 20 languages and dialects, the actors whose performances have won awards have worked in seven major languages: Hindi (twenty-five awards), Malayalam (fourteen awards), Tamil (nine awards), Bengali (five awards), Marathi and Kannada (three awards) and English (two awards).

The first recipient was Uttam Kumar from Bengali cinema, who was honoured at the 15th National Film Awards in 1967 for his performances in Anthony Firingee and Chiriyakhana. He was also the first actor who won this award for two different films in the same year. As of 2020, Amitabh Bachchan is the most honoured actor with four awards. Kamal Haasan, Mammootty and Ajay Devgn with three awards, while six actors—Mohanlal, Sanjeev Kumar, Om Puri, Naseeruddin Shah, Mithun Chakraborty, and Dhanush—have won the award two times.  Two actors have achieved the honour for performing in two languagesMithun Chakraborty (Hindi and Bengali) and Mammootty (Malayalam and English). Riddhi Sen is the youngest recipient of the award at the age of 19. The most recent recipients are Ajay Devgn and Suriya, who were honoured at the 68th National Film Awards for their performances in the films Tanhaji and Soorarai Pottru respectively.

Key

Multiple winners 
4 Wins : Amitabh Bachchan
 3 Wins : Kamal Haasan, Mammootty, Ajay Devgn
 2 Wins : Sanjeev Kumar, Naseeruddin Shah, Om Puri, Mithun Chakraborty, Mohanlal, Dhanush

Recipients

Footnotes

References

External links
 Official Page for Directorate of Film Festivals, India
 National Film Awards Archives

Actors
Film awards for lead actor